Ekaterina Vladimirovna Makarova (born 15 February 1996) is a Russian tennis player.

Makarova has career-high WTA rankings of 215 in singles, and 177 in doubles, both achieved August 2022. She has won five singles titles and eight doubles titles at tournaments of the ITF Women's Circuit.

Makarova made her WTA Tour main-draw debut at the 2021 Luxembourg Open, defeating Yana Morderger in the final qualifying round.

Grand Slam performance timeline

Singles

ITF Circuit finals

Singles: 8 (5 titles, 3 runner–ups)

Doubles: 16 (8 titles, 8 runner-ups)

References

External links
 
 

1996 births
Living people
Russian female tennis players
21st-century Russian women
20th-century Russian women